Cantey is an unincorporated community in Kershaw County, in the U.S. state of South Carolina.

History
The community was named after the local Cantey family, early settlers. A variant name is "Cantey Hill". A post office called Cantey was established in 1884, and remained in operation until 1921.

References

Unincorporated communities in South Carolina
Unincorporated communities in Kershaw County, South Carolina